Albert Angelo may also refer to the former mayor of Vancouver, Washington.

Albert Angelo is the second novel written by the experimental novelist B. S. Johnson (1933–1973).  Published in 1964 by Constable (and reissued in 1987 by New Directions), the book achieved fame for having holes cut in several pages as a narrative technique.  It is written in an unusual and pioneering style, frequently changing from first-person narrative to third-person commentary, and often descending into stream-of-consciousness interior monologue.  Like many of Johnson's novels it is an auto-biographical work.

Plot

Albert Angelo tells the story of Albert Angelo, a substitute teacher who longs to be a professional architect.  He has had to resort to teaching to make ends meet, as he is not an accomplished enough architect to make a living from it.  Living in a flat in Angel in London, he finds himself teaching in increasingly tougher schools, and part of the story concerns his struggle with difficult pupils in class, mirroring Albert's struggle with life in general.  Through the reproduction of some of their essays, we also learn the pupils' opinions of Albert and their attitudes towards him, which are often hilarious.

Albert devotes much thought to his ex-girlfriend Jenny, with whom he is still very much in love and who he feels betrayed him.  He reminisces about her frequently.  His friend Terry, whom he accompanies to late-night cafes, was also 'betrayed' by a woman, and their friendship is built upon this common experience.

The story is at times humorous and at others incredibly serious. As is usual in a Johnson novel sexuality is openly and frankly discussed. Johnson's writing technique allows us to view Albert's character from many angles.

Style
As mentioned, the book is written in an unorthodox style.  This is typical of Johnson, though it is not uniform throughout his books.  Albert Angelo is divided into several parts, ending with a coda, normally used in musical score.  Several of the pages have holes cut into them, allowing the reader to glimpse events further ahead in the story.  The book closes with an intervention by the author, explaining what he was trying to achieve in writing it.  In this section is Johnson's unshakeable belief recorded - Telling stories is telling lies.

References in other works
In Brian Castro's 1994 novel Drift, (which is Castro's answer to B.S. Johnson's invitation to his readers to complete The Matrix Trilogy of which See the Old Lady Decently (1975) is the first book) the character B.S. (Byron Shelly) Johnson, has his copy of Albert Angelo confiscated by the Australian Customs authorities because "there were holes cut in the pages and they wanted to view the excisions".

External links
An essay on Albert Angelo at Literary London
Information about Albert Angelo at bsjohnson.info
Andy Wimbush's write-up of 'Albert Angelo' on the London Fictions website

References

1964 British novels
English novels
Novels set in London
Constable & Co. books
First-person narrative novels
Second-person narrative novels
Third-person narrative novels
Stream of consciousness novels